Oppeliinae is a subfamily within the Oppeliidae, a family of Jurassic ammonites characterized by forms that are mainly oxyconic, compressed with sharp venters, in the adult and with keeled inner whorls. Sutures are complex, consisting of a long series of evenly graded lobes and saddles with finely frilled endings.

The Oppeliinae gave rise to the Hecticoceratinae in the early Bathonian stage, near the middle of their range and to the Taramelliceratinae, in the late Callovian, near the end of their tange, which in turn gave rise to the Streblitinae in the early Kimmeridgian and to the Haploceratidae in the late Kimmeridgian.

Distribution is worldwide, from the Middle Jurassic, except for Boreal regions.

List of genera
The Oppeliinae includes the following genera, listed in order of appearance.

Bradfordia
Oppelia
Oxycerites
Paralcidia
Strugia
Trimargina
Magharina
Oecostraustes
Stregoxites

References

Oppeliidae
Jurassic ammonites
Bathonian first appearances
Middle Jurassic extinctions